Night of Adventure (Chinese: 疯狂72小时) is a 2014 Chinese comedy film directed by Li Jixian.

Cast
Yan Ni
Geng Le
Shao Bing 
Bao Bei'er

Reception
The film has grossed US$4.24 million in China.

References

2014 comedy films
Chinese comedy films